The 1984 Soviet Cup Final was a football match that took place at the Lenin's Central Stadium, Moscow on June 24, 1984. The match was the 43rd Soviet Cup Final and it was contested by FC Dynamo Moscow and FC Zenit Saint Petersburg (Leningrad). The Soviet Cup winner Dinamo won the cup for the sixth time. The last year defending holders Shakhter Donetsk were eliminated in the round of 16 of the competition by Chernomorets Odessa.

Road to Moscow 
All sixteen Soviet Top League clubs did not have to go through qualification to get into the competition, so Dinamo and Zenit both qualified for the competition automatically.

Note: In all results below, the score of the finalist is given first (H: home; A: away).

Previous Encounters

Match details

MATCH OFFICIALS 
Assistant referees:
 Ivan Timoshenko (Rostov-na-Donu)
 Vladimir Kuznetsov (Omsk)
Fourth official: 

MATCH RULES
90 minutes.
30 minutes of extra-time if necessary.
Penalty shoot-out if scores still level.
Seven named substitutes
Maximum of 3 substitutions.

See also
 1984 Soviet Top League
 1984 Soviet First League
 1984 Soviet Second League

References

External links 
The competition calendar

1984
Cup
Soviet Cup Final 1984
Soviet Cup Final 1984
June 1984 sports events in Europe
1984 in Moscow